"As Long as I Got You" is a song by British recording artist Lily Allen, from her third studio album, Sheezus (2014). It was released as the fifth and final single from the album on August 24, 2014.

Background 
Allen confirmed during an interview to the BBC at Glastonbury that she recorded a music video for another album track and a music video for a future single. She later confirmed it would serve for the track "As Long as I Got You".

Composition 
"As Long as I Got You" is a zydeco and country song. Kenneth Partridge commented on the track's Cajun influence by stating, "Maybe all Allen needed was a trip to New Orleans" to make a "Cajun-spiced, country-fried, half-baked tune".

Chart performance

References 

2014 songs
2014 singles
Lily Allen songs
Songs written by Greg Kurstin
Songs written by Karen Poole
Songs written by Lily Allen
Song recordings produced by Greg Kurstin